NCIS: New Orleans is an American action crime drama and police procedural television series that premiered on CBS on September 23, 2014, following the twelfth season of NCIS. The pilot was written by Gary Glasberg. Produced by CBS Studios, Wings Productions and, for the first four seasons, When Pigs Fly Incorporated, the series stars Scott Bakula and CCH Pounder. The series, set and filmed in New Orleans, is the third series of the NCIS franchise. In May 2020, the show was renewed for the seventh season, which premiered on November 8, 2020. In February 2021, CBS announced that the seventh season would be the series' final one. The series concluded on May 23, 2021, making it the first show in the NCIS franchise to end.

Premise 
NCIS: New Orleans follows a fictional team of Naval Criminal Investigative Service (NCIS) Special Agents stationed out of New Orleans, Louisiana and led by Supervisory Special Agent Dwayne Cassius Pride (Scott Bakula). The team focuses on crimes that involve personnel in the United States Navy and Marine Corps, and their territory ranges from the Mississippi River to the Texas Panhandle. Working under the supervision of Pride at the start of the series are Christopher LaSalle (Lucas Black), a former Jefferson Parish Sheriff's Deputy recruited by Pride following Hurricane Katrina, and Meredith Brody (Zoe McLellan), a transfer from the NCIS Great Lakes field office, who has worked as a Special Agent Afloat and is keen to leave her past behind as she moves to New Orleans. They are assisted by Dr. Loretta Wade (CCH Pounder), the coroner for Jefferson Parish, Sebastian Lund (Rob Kerkovich), a forensics specialist who assists Wade, and Patton Plame (Daryl "Chill" Mitchell), a paraplegic hacker turned computer specialist for NCIS. In season 2, Sonja Percy (Shalita Grant), an ATF Special Agent who assisted the team on the Baitfish case the prior season, joins them on a permanent basis.

At the end of season 2, a case involving a domestic terrorist attack and a corrupt Department of Homeland Security Special Agent leads to backlash that culminates in Brody's resignation from NCIS at the start of season 3. Following this, FBI Special Agent Tammy Gregorio (Vanessa Ferlito) is sent to investigate Pride and his team; she is later recruited to NCIS after being fired by the FBI after a vital part of their case against a drug cartel goes wrong on her watch. Also, Sebastian, after taking an interest in field work, completes FLETC training and joins the team as a Forensics Agent during the season.

Near the end of season 4, Percy leaves the team after accepting an offer to join the FBI. Shortly after, Pride is shot and nearly killed by the vengeful wife of an assassin linked to the Clearwater case, whom he had killed in season 3. He recovers at the start of season 5, and later accepts a promotion to Regional Special-Agent-In-Charge for a change of pace. Arriving to replace him is Supervisory Special Agent Hannah Khoury (Necar Zadegan), a former intelligence agent looking to settle down and reconnect with her family.

In season 6, Khoury is demoted from team leader after breaking protocol in a joint-operation with the FBI, allowing Pride to return and retake his old position, though Khoury stays on as second-in-command. Also during the season, LaSalle's search into his brother Cade's disappearance, and later, murder, results in his own death at the hands of the same killer. After being avenged and mourned, he is soon replaced by the notoriously anti-social Special Agent Quentin Carter (Charles Michael Davis) a fixer with a reputation for working alone who gradually warms to the team over time.

In season 7, with the COVID-19 pandemic having thrown the city of New Orleans into uncertainty, JAG Commander Rita Devereaux (Chelsea Field), Pride's long-time girlfriend and a seasoned attorney, joins the D.A.'s office to help with restoring social justice, while Pride joins a task-force set up by the mayor to restore the city. The two eventually marry in the series finale.

Cast and characters 

 Scott Bakula as Dwayne "King" Cassius Pride, NCIS Supervisory Special Agent (SSA) / Special Agent in Charge (SAC)
 Lucas Black as Christopher LaSalle, NCIS Senior Field Agent (seasons 1–6)
 Zoe McLellan as Meredith Brody, NCIS Special Agent (SA) (seasons 1–2)
 Rob Kerkovich as Sebastian Lund, forensic scientist / NCIS Forensics Agent
 CCH Pounder as Loretta Wade, medical examiner
 Shalita Grant as Sonja Percy, ATF SA / NCIS SA / FBI SA (recurring season 1; main seasons 2–4)
 Daryl "Chill" Mitchell as Patton Plame, also known as Triple P, NCIS Computer Specialist (recurring season 1; main seasons 2–7)
 Vanessa Ferlito as Tammy Gregorio, FBI SA, Washington DC/ NCIS SA (seasons 3–7)
 Necar Zadegan as Hannah Khoury, NCIS Senior Field Agent / Special Agent in Charge and second in command in NCIS NOLA Office (seasons 5–7)
 Charles Michael Davis as Quentin Carter, NCIS SA (seasons 6–7)
 Chelsea Field as Rita Deveraux (recurring season 3–6; main season 7)

Episodes

Production

Development 
In September 2013, NCIS: New Orleans was introduced with a two-part backdoor pilot during the eleventh season of NCIS. The episode title "Crescent City (Part I)" and "Crescent City (Part II)", written by Gary Glasberg, which aired on March 25, 2014, to April 1, 2014, a second spin off from NCIS and set filmed located in New Orleans. NCIS: New Orleans picked up to series on May 9, 2014, NCIS: New Orleans premiered on September 23, 2014, on CBS. On October 27, 2014, CBS picked up NCIS: New Orleans for a full season of 23 episodes. On January 12, 2015, NCIS: New Orleans was renewed for a second season, that premiered on September 22, 2015. NCIS: New Orleans was renewed for a third season on March 25, 2016, which premiered on September 20, 2016. The third season was the last season produced by the NCIS: New Orleans creator and showrunner Gary Glasberg before he died on September 28, 2016. NCIS: New Orleans was renewed for a fourth season on March 23, 2017, which premiered on September 26, 2017. NCIS: New Orleans was renewed for a fifth season on April 18, 2018, which premiered on September 25, 2018. NCIS: New Orleans was renewed for a sixth season on April 22, 2019, which premiered on September 24, 2019. On May 6, 2020, NCIS: New Orleans was renewed for the seventh season, which premiered on November 8, 2020. On February 17, 2021, it was announced that the seventh season would be the show's last, with the finale airing on May 23, 2021.

Casting 
In February 2014, the pilot was cast with Scott Bakula, CCH Pounder, and Zoe McLellan as Dwayne Pride, Loretta Wade, and Meredith Brody. Lucas Black as Christopher LaSalle, and Rob Kerkovich joined cast as Sebastian Lund. In June 2015, Deadline Hollywood reported that Daryl Mitchell and Shalita Grant promoted as regulars in season two.

In July 2016, Zoe McLellan, who plays Special Agent Meredith Brody, left the series "for creative reasons", and Vanessa Ferlito joined the cast as Special Agent Tammy Gregorio as a series regular.

In January 2018, it was announced that Shalita Grant, who plays Special Agent Sonja Percy, would be departing the series near the end of the fourth season. In August 2018, it was announced that Necar Zadegan would join the cast as Special Agent Hannah Khoury as a new series regular for the fifth season.

In 2018, Jason Alan Carvell was cast as James Edwin "Jimmy" Boyd who is the paternal half-brother of NCIS Special Agent Dwayne Pride. He reprised his role from time to time until the show's finale in 2021.

In November 2019, Lucas Black, who portrayed Agent Christopher LaSalle, announced he would be departing in the sixth episode of the sixth season. On February 5, 2020, it was announced that Charles Michael Davis had been cast as Quentin Carter, and would appear as a series regular. On September 29, 2020, it was announced that Chelsea Field portraying attorney Rita Devereaux would be a series regular for the seventh season after recurring for the previous four seasons.

Controversy 
Brad Kern took over the reins of NCIS: New Orleans as showrunner in January 2016. Within a year he had become the focus of two investigations for inappropriate behavior toward women. On May 17, 2018, it was reported that Kern was exiting his role as executive producer and showrunner, but would remain as consulting producer, with Christopher Silber replacing him as showrunner. Kern was placed on suspension in June 2018, when CBS launched a third investigation into claims of harassment. Kern was fired by CBS in October 2018.

Broadcast 
NCIS: New Orleans premiered on CBS in the United States on Tuesday, September 23, 2014, with the twelfth season premiere of NCIS as its lead-in. Season two premiered on September 22, 2015. Season three premiered on September 20, 2016. Season four premiered on September 26, 2017. Season five premiered on September 25, 2018. Season six premiered on September 24, 2019. NCIS: New Orleans aired simultaneously on Global in Canada. In Australia, NCIS: New Orleans premiered on Network Ten on October 7, 2014. NCIS: New Orleans was initially sold to Channel 5 in the United Kingdom, where it premiered on February 13, 2015 and aired for four seasons, before moving to Fox UK beginning July 20, 2018. NCIS: New Orleans has aired on Prime in New Zealand, on AXN in India and on Fox in Southeast Asia. On April 2, 2015, the series began airing on South Africa's M-Net cable TV service and was also broadcast to several other sub-Saharan African nations via DStv.

Syndication 
In August 2015, NCIS: New Orleans began airing on TVOne Pakistan

In December 2017, reruns of NCIS: New Orleans began airing on TNT and FX.

In January 2021, reruns of NCIS: New Orleans began airing on Ion Television.

Reception

Ratings

Critical reception 
NCIS: New Orleans has received mixed reviews from critics. Review aggregator Rotten Tomatoes gives the first season of the show a rating of 65%, based on 26 reviews, with an average rating of 5.4/10. The site's consensus reads, "With a solid cast in a beautiful locale, NCIS: New Orleans makes extending this well-worn franchise look like the Big Easy." Metacritic gives the show a score of 55 out of 100, based on 15 critics, indicating "mixed or average reviews".

In late September 2014, The Wraps journalist Jason Hughes reviewed the pilot episode of the series, praising the music, the use of the city of New Orleans, and CBS' decision to cast Scott Bakula as "one of the most likable leading men in television, so they're set there."

David Hinckley of the New York Daily News gave a mixed but critical review of the pilot episode, saying there is a "Crescent City flavor here. But in the larger picture, not much on this menu is unfamiliar." Liz Shannon Miller and Ben Travers of Indiewire said that NCIS is like "the obelisk in 2001: A Space Odyssey, it's an awe-inspiring, inescapable presence in the broadcast line-up. NCIS on CBS: It is here. It has always been here. It forever will be."

International criticism 
In April 2019, CBS released the plot of the first part of the show's fifth season's finale, "The River Styx, Part I", which is set to partially take place in the breakaway republic of South Ossetia, a region internationally recognized as part of Georgia but also recognized as independent by Russia, Nauru, Nicaragua, Venezuela, and Syria. The show, when describing the region, calls South Ossetia a "war-torn Russian province", which raised concerns from the Georgian government. On April 22, 2019, Georgian President Salome Zourabichvili posted on Twitter. 

Neither CBS nor the show's producers have responded to the President's commentary. However, the description of the second part of the finale, "The River Styx, Part II" does not mention Russia, although the episode still takes place in South Ossetia.

Awards and nominations

Notes

References 

 General references

External links 

 
 

 
2014 American television series debuts
2021 American television series endings
2010s American crime drama television series
2010s American police procedural television series
2020s American crime drama television series
2020s American police procedural television series
American action television series
CBS original programming
English-language television shows
American military television series
Television series by CBS Studios
Television shows set in New Orleans
American television spin-offs
Television shows filmed in New Orleans
Fictional portrayals of the New Orleans Police Department
Television shows featuring audio description